Brooklyn Bounce is one of several pseudonyms used by German producers Matthias Menck (Double M) and Dennis Bohn (Bonebreaker). They have also produced music under the names Mental Madness Productions and Beatbox feat. Rael. Menck and Bohn have created remixes of a wide array of artists, including Scooter and Kool & the Gang.

Career
Menck and Bohn, both natives to Hamburg, met in 1995. The pair had their first chart hit starring as Boyz R Us with the single "Singin' in My Mind". In 1996 the duo debuted as Brooklyn Bounce and released "The Theme (of Progressive Attack)" which scaled the German dance charts as a club favourite before becoming a crossover hit for the group as well. This success set up the band's debut album, The Beginning.

Menck and Bohn work solely in the studio and are not part of the Brooklyn Bounce live act. Instead, the group was fronted by several different vocalists and dancers, who have collaborated with the two German producers throughout the years. The list includes René "Diablo" Behrens (formerly of 666), Ulrika Bohn, Maeva Ehoulan, Alejandra Cuevas-Moreno and Stephan "Damon" Zschoppe. Vocalists were only credited from "Bass, Beats and Melody", released in November 2000.

In 2006, Mental Madness Records released an album titled System Shock (The Lost Album 1999), which features some of the earliest material by the production duo. This album is available only in a digital format.

Discography

Singles

Albums

Other projects by Menck and Bohn
Beatbox feat. Rael
1998 "Let the Music Play"
1998 "Come into My Club" (with DJ Shahin and Stephan Browarczyk)
2000 "Show Me Love"

Boyz-R-Us
1996 "Singin' in my Mind" (with Emanuel Jones)
1998 "Singin' in my Mind '98" (with Emanuel Jones)
1999 "Alright" (with Emanuel Jones)
2002 "All Day/Let It All Out"

Other aliases
1997 "Follow Me", as Mental Madness Productions
1998 "Deeper Love", as Mental Madness Productions
1998 "Watch Me", as Abuna E
2000 "Druck! (Es Ist Zeit)", as DJ Bonebreaker
2001 "Friday Nite", as Double M (with Sophie Schmachl and Christoph Brüx)
2002 "Husten", as DJ Bonebreaker

Production for other artists
2001 Terraformer - "All Over" (with Natalie Tineo)

References

External links
Official Website

Non-official Fanclub

Electronic music duos
German house music groups
German musical duos
German techno music groups
German trance music groups
Musical groups established in 1996
Musical groups from Hamburg